Kingdon Chapple-Wilson (born 1991), known professionally as Kings, is a New Zealand rapper, singer and songwriter. He has been producing music under his self-run label Arch Angel Records since 2018, and holds the record for longest-running No. 1 single in New Zealand for his 2016 song "Don't Worry Bout' It".

Early life 
Kings is of Māori and Samoan ethnicity. His grandfather was artist and educator Arnold Manaaki Wilson. He has one daughter and they live in Auckland, New Zealand. He is 6 feet tall. His music studio is at Awataha Marae, which was built by his grandfather. Kings began playing the guitar at age seven and first learned the skills of his trade from completing a foundation year course at MAINZ.

Career 
Kings started his career providing music production services for companies around the world for use in commercials, television and film. He pursued a solo career in the mid-2010s, collaborating with New Zealand electronic producers such as Dan Aux, General Lee, and Jolyon Petch. 

In 2016, Kings released his debut single "Don't Worry Bout' It". The song became the biggest New Zealand single release that year and surpassed the record for longest running No. 1 on the New Zealand Singles Chart, previously held by Lorde, spending 33 consecutive weeks at the top. The music video was filmed impromptu by Kings in Fiji and then edited on the plane ride home. "Don't Worry Bout' It" was certified double platinum and won the "Highest Selling New Zealand Single" and "Radio Airplay Record of the Year" awards at the 2017 Vodafone New Zealand Music Awards.

Kings released his self-titled debut extended play (EP) in late 2016, which also included the singles "What We Supposed To Do" and "Someday". Kings was named "Breakthrough Artist of The Year" at the 2016 Vodafone New Zealand Music Awards, as well as "Best Pacific Male Artist", "Best Urban Artist", "Best Producer" at the Vodafone Pacific Music Awards. Kings was nominated for "Best Solo Artist" for the EP, at the 2017 New Zealand Music Awards.

In late 2017, Kings independently released his debut album Chapter One. The album featured the singles "We'll Never Know", "Domino" and "In the Sun". Six months later Kings released his second album Two, in early 2018, which featured the singles "You Do" and "Temporary Me". The single "Temporary Me" saw Kings make the finalist list for the 2018 APRA Silver Scroll Award. In 2021, Kings was featured on the New Zealand version of The Masked Singer as the "Monster". He was revealed in his fifth appearance.

Discography

Studio albums

Extended plays

Singles

Guest appearances 

Notes

References

New Zealand people of Samoan descent
21st-century New Zealand male singers
People from North Shore, New Zealand
New Zealand record producers
New Zealand rappers
New Zealand male singer-songwriters
New Zealand Māori male singers
New Zealand hip hop musicians
Samoan musicians
Year of birth missing (living people)
Living people
Warner Music Group artists
Ngāi Tūhoe people
Te Arawa people
Musicians from Auckland
Pacific reggae
Māori-language singers